The Maadi Cup is the prize for the New Zealand Secondary Schools Boys' Under 18 Rowing Eights. More colloquially, it is the name given to the New Zealand Secondary Schools Rowing Regatta, at which the Maadi Cup is raced. The regatta is the largest school sports event in the Southern Hemisphere, with over 2,450 rowers from 123 secondary schools participating in 2021. The regatta is held annually in late March, alternating between the country's two main rowing venues: Lake Karapiro near Cambridge (odd years), and Lake Ruataniwha near Twizel (even years).

The top prizes at the regatta are the Maadi Cup, Springbok Shield, Levin Jubilee Cup, Dawn Cup and Star Trophy. The fastest time was Hamilton Boys High School in 1987 with a record time of 5.51.80 (Fastest as of 2022). Note the fastest ever time at a regatta (5:42.67) was recorded by the Hamilton Boys' High School 1st VIII at the 2013 North Island Secondary Schools' Championship Regatta that took place just before the Maadi Cup, which they also won that year.

History 
During World War II, members of the 2nd NZEF based at Maadi Camp in Egypt competed in regattas on the Nile against local Egyptian rowing clubs. At a regatta held on 20 November 1943 the Maadi Camp Rowing Club "Kiwi" oarsmen beat the Cairo River Club by 11 points to six to win the Freyberg Cup, which they then gifted to the competitors. In return, as a token of friendship, Youssef Baghat presented the Kiwis with a cup. Youssef Baghat's cup was offered to the NZARA (now NZRA) as a trophy for an annual boys' eight-oared race between secondary schools and was brought to New Zealand at the end of the war.

Renamed the Maadi Cup it was first raced for in 1947 at Wanganui where it was won by Mount Albert Grammar School, who beat Sacred Heart College by a half-length. Four boats took part in the original race, with Allan Tong a member of Wanganui Technical College; he would later compete in the New Zealand at the 1956 Summer Olympics in Melbourne, Australia, in the coxed four. The fourth boat was from St Augustine's College. The Maadi Cup gained its native timber pyramid shaped base from Mt Albert Grammar's woodwork master and first rowing coach, Jack Jenkin, in 1951. Only 17 schools have ever won the cup, with Wanganui Collegiate School the most successful, having won it 17 times.

Members for the 2nd NZEF competed in rowing regattas and won races run by the Cairo River Club until they were shipped back to New Zealand at the end of the War.

Schools that have won the Maadi Cup:

As of the 2022 event, 17 schools have won the Maadi Cup.

Springbok Shield (BU184+)
The Springbok Shield is the prize for the boys' under 18 coxed four. It was instigated in 1964 by Mr Cecil Purvis who was visiting South Africa at the time and met with members of the Johannesburg youth rowing community. After much discussion the Springbok Shield eventuated. The Shield is made from segments of all the woods from South Africa and was first rowed for in 1965 when it was won by Hamilton Boys' High School.

As of the 2022 event, 18 schools have won the Springbok Shield.

Levin 75th Jubilee Cup (GU188+)
The Levin Cup is awarded to the winner of the girls' under 18 eight. In 1981 the Maadi Regatta was held on Lake Horowhenua. That year the Levin Borough Council was holding its 75th Jubilee. The mayor, Jack Bolderson, decided that a fitting memorial would be for a cup for the girls senior eight. The inaugural winner was Wanganui Girls College.

As of the 2022 event, 10 schools have won the Levin 75th Jubilee Cup.

Dawn Cup (GU184+)
The Dawn Cup is awarded to the winner of the girls' under 18 coxed four. At the Maadi Regatta of 1980 held on the Wairoa River, a cup was donated by Noel Lynch for the Girls Under 18 Four. On finals day, officials were unable to keep to time and by dark, the Boys Under 17 Eight and the Girls Under 18 Four had not been rowed. These races were then scheduled to be held at 6:30 am Sunday morning (no daylight saving). Because of this, Noel Lynch and Enoka Macdonald decided this trophy should be called the Dawn Cup and it was first won by Queen Charlotte College.

As of the 2022 event, 16 schools have won the Dawn Cup.

Star Trophy
Since 1997, the Star Trophy is the prize awarded to the top overall school at the Regatta, and therefore come to denote the top rowing school in New Zealand. The Star trophy was donated by Star Boating Club, which it is named after. The award is determined on a points basis: schools winning events get 5 points, runners up get 3 points, and third place-getters get one point.

As of the 2022 event, 6 schools have won the Star Trophy

Executive Trophy 
Since 2003, the Executive Trophy is the prize awarded to the top overall school in sweep-oar events (i.e. pairs, fours and eights) at the Regatta.

As of the 2022 event, 4 schools have won the Executive Trophy. 

Presidents Scull
Since 2003, the Presidents Scull is the prize awarded to the top overall school in sculling events (i.e. singles, doubles and quads) at the Regatta.

As of the 2022 event, 12 schools have won the Presidents Scull.

Eligibility
Rowers and coxswains in the Maadi Cup must be full-time students (at least 0.8 FTE) at a registered New Zealand school, and must be studying at secondary level (Year 9 or above). They must also have a satisfactory school attendance record, in the opinion of the school's principal, in order to participate.

The regatta is split into four age classification: under 15, under 16, under 17, and under 18. Only students who are under the specified age at 1 January preceding the regatta may compete in that class. For example, a student who is aged 15 on 1 January may compete in the under 16, under 17 and under 18 classifications, but not the under 15 classification.

Females may cox male boats, and vice versa. The minimum weight for coxswains is 55 kg for under 18 open-weight events, and 50 kg for all other events. For lightweight events, the international weight standard is used: males must be under 72.5 kg, and females must be under 59 kg.

In mid-2007, the New Zealand Secondary Schools Sports Council introduced a quota system restricting the number of new-to-school and international students a school can field at national championships, including the Maadi Cup, in an aim to reduce top sporting schools "poaching" athletes from other schools. A new-to-school student is a student who has enrolled at the school in the 24 months prior to the event, excluding students who enrolled at the school in Year 9 or below. An international student is a student who is not a New Zealand or Australian citizen, or the holder of a New Zealand resident visa or domestic-endorsed student visa. For eights, no more than three crew members that are classified as a new-to-school or international students are permitted per boat, with no more than two crew members being international students. For all other events, no more than one crew member that is classified as a new-to-school or international student is permitted per boat.

Events
As of 2021

Recent winners

Major events

Overall points

Karapiro vs Ruataniwha 
A comparison of recorded gold-medal winning times from 1995 to 2022 yields the following results, Based on average winning times, Karapiro tends to record faster times.

References

External links
– Official Maadi Cup regatta website
– Website of the New Zealand Secondary School Rowing Association
– College Sport Media record of Maadi Cup boys and girls winners since 1947

Rowing competitions in New Zealand
New Zealand sports trophies and awards
Scholastic rowing